St Cleer is a civil parish and village in east Cornwall, England, United Kingdom. The village is situated on the southeast flank of Bodmin Moor approximately two miles (3 km) north of Liskeard. The population of the parish in 2001 numbered 3257. This includes Common Moor and had increased to 3,297 at the 2011 census. An electoral ward also exists. The population at the 2011 census is 4,366.

Parish church
St Cleer parish church, at an elevation of approximately 690 feet (210 metres), is dedicated to Saint Clarus. Its three-stage tower is 97 feet (30 metres) high and contains a ring of six bells. First built in 800 but rebuilt in the 13th century, the tower suffered damage and was repaired in the 15th century. The church is a Grade I listed building, having been so designated on 21 August 1964. It is of Norman origin, with early fifteenth century additions, further  substantial additions in the late fifteenth century and late nineteenth century restorations. It is constructed of granite rubble. The roofs are slated with ridge tiles, and crested ridge tiles over the nave and chancel.

St Clarus was an Englishman who went to Cornwall to preach to the inhabitants in the 8th century. He founded the church of St Cleer and lived a saintly life nearby. However, he rejected the advances of a local chieftainess who had fallen in love with him and when she continued to pester him he fled to France where he lived in an isolated hermitage. The enraged woman had him pursued and then murdered. The place he had lived was afterwards named Saint-Clair-sur-Epte. The saint's feast day is 4 November.

Prehistoric and medieval remains

Trethevy Quoit is a megalithic chamber tomb, and the Doniert Stone an inscribed stone of the Brittonic Anglo-Saxon period. Near the churchyard is St Cleer's holy well with a small building covering it, built of granite in the 15th century, to allow for a bowssening pool for total immersion.

Arthur Langdon (1896) recorded five Cornish crosses in the parish; one called Long Tom is at St Cleer Common, another is at St Cleer's Well and a cross at Trevorgy is missing. There are also two stones at Redgate of which one is the Doniert Stone and the other is known at the Other Half Stone.

Another cross was discovered at East Fursnewth Farm in 1930 and afterwards removed and erected at Pendean House, Liskeard.

References

External links

Villages in Cornwall
Civil parishes in Cornwall
Holy wells in Cornwall
Bodmin Moor